Shargacucullia lychnitis, the striped lychnis is a moth of the family Noctuidae. It is found throughout most parts of Europe the Near East and Middle East (Lebanon, Israel, Afghanistan, Iran, Turkmenistan and Iraq).

Technical description and variation

C. lychnitis Rmb. (27 g). Forewing narrow, pale ochreous with a more rufous tinge than in thapsiphaga [Shargacucullia thapsiphaga (Treitschke, 1826) ], the costal streak darker; hindwing in both sexes whitish, the terminal shade narrower in the male. Larva greenish white with a pale yellow band on each segment; a dorsal row of curved black bars alternating with rows of 4 black spots; a row of black spots along the sides. The wingspan is 42–47 mm.

Biology
Adults are on wing from February to April in the eastern parts of its range. In Britain it is on wing from June to July. There is one generation per year.

The larvae feed on the leaves and flowers of Verbascum species (including Verbascum lychnitis, Verbascum nigrum and Verbascum austriacum).

Subspecies
Shargacucullia lychnitis lychnitis
Shargacucullia lychnitis albicans (eastern part of the range)

Similar species
Shargacucullia lychnitis is difficult to certainly distinguish from these congeners. See Townsend et al.
Shargacucullia scrophulariae ([Denis & Schiffermüller], 1775) 
Shargacucullia verbasci (Linnaeus, 1758)

References

External links

Striped lychnis (Cucullia lychnitis) on UKmoths
Fauna Europaea
Cucullia lychnitis on Lepiforum.de

Cuculliinae
Moths of Europe
Moths of Asia
Moths of the Middle East
Taxa named by Jules Pierre Rambur